Gérard Tremblay may refer to:

 Gérard Tremblay (bishop) (1918–2019), Canadian bishop of the Roman Catholic Church
 Gérard Tremblay (racing driver) (born 1950), French former racing driver

See also
 Gérald Tremblay (born 1942), former Canadian politician and businessman
 Gerald R. Tremblay (born 1944), Canadian lawyer